John or Ivan Asen may refer to:

 Ivan Asen I (1186–1196), ruler of Bulgaria
 Ivan Asen II (1218–1241), ruler of Bulgaria
 Ivan Asen III (1279–1280), ruler of Bulgaria
 John Komnenos Asen, ruler of Valona
 John Doukas Angelos Palaiologos Raoul Laskaris Tornikes Philanthropenos Asen, 14th- or 15th-century Byzantine noble child